The term Metropolitanate of Skopje may refer to:

 Metropolitanate of Skopje, an Eastern Orthodox canonical metropolitanate with seat in the city of Skopje, that historically existed in continuity, under several consequent ecclesiastical jurisdictions.
 Bulgarian Orthodox Metropolitanate of Skopje, an Eastern Orthodox (noncanonical) metropolitanate of the Bulgarian Exarchate, that existed in the second half of 19th century and the beginning of 20th century.
 Macedonian Orthodox Metropolitanate of Skopje, an Eastern Orthodox (noncanonical) metropolitanate of the Macedonian Orthodox Church, created in 1967.

See also
 Skopje
 Archbishopric of Ohrid (disambiguation)
 Eastern Orthodoxy in North Macedonia
 Serbian Patriarchate of Peć
 Bulgarian Exarchate
 Macedonian Orthodox Church